Rudolf Nafziger (11 August 1945 – 13 July 2008) was a German footballer who was part of the Bayern Munich team of the late-1960s. He won one cap for West Germany, in 1965.

References

External links
 

1945 births
2008 deaths
German footballers
Germany international footballers
Germany B international footballers
Germany under-21 international footballers
Bundesliga players
FC Bayern Munich footballers
FC St. Gallen players
Hannover 96 players
LASK players
Association football forwards
People from Starnberg (district)
Sportspeople from Upper Bavaria
Footballers from Bavaria
West German footballers
West German expatriate footballers
West German expatriate sportspeople in Austria
West German expatriate sportspeople in Switzerland
Expatriate footballers in Austria
Expatriate footballers in Switzerland